Her Favourite Husband (also known by the alternative titles The Taming of Dorothy and Quel bandito sono io) is a 1950 British-Italian comedy film directed by Mario Soldati and starring Jean Kent, Robert Beatty and Margaret Rutherford. It was based on a play by Peppino De Filippo. The film's art direction was by Piero Gherardi.

Plot
Mild mannered Italian bank clerk Antonio, much dominated by his English wife Dorothy, is the double of Leo L'Americano, a local gangster. The gangster kidnaps Antonio and takes his place as husband in the family, to give him cover for a big bank robbery, which he plans to pin on Antonio. Farcical confusions ensue.

Cast
 Jean Kent as Dorothy Pellegrini 
 Robert Beatty as Antonio Pellegrini 
 Gordon Harker as Godfrey Dotherington 
 Margaret Rutherford as Mrs. Dotherington 
 Rona Anderson as Stellina 
 Walter Crisham as Caradiotto 
 Max Adrian as Catoni 
 Tamara Lees as Rosana 
 Michael Balfour as Pete 
 Jack McNaughton as El Greco 
 Norman Shelley as Mr. Dobson 
 Danny Green as Angel Face 
 Joss Ambler as Mr. Wilson 
 Mary Hinton as Mrs. Wilson 
 Peter Illing as Commissario Scaletti 
 Jimmy Ventola as Ciocio Pellegrini 
 Andreas Malandrinos as Customs Officer

Critical reception
TV Guide wrote, "corny dialog bogs this film down much of the time" ; while Allmovie described it as "a genial romp distinguished by a sizeable supporting cast of familiar British players."

References

External links

1950 films
British comedy films
Italian comedy films
1950 comedy films
Films directed by Mario Soldati
Films set in Naples
Films produced by Carlo Ponti
Lux Film films
Films with screenplays by Noel Langley
British black-and-white films
1950s English-language films
1950s British films
1950s Italian films